Velyka Bahachka Raion was a raion (district) in Poltava Oblast of central Ukraine. The raion's administrative center was the urban-type settlement of Velyka Bahachka. The raion was abolished and its territory was merged into Myrhorod Raion on 18 July 2020 as part of the administrative reform of Ukraine, which reduced the number of raions of Poltava Oblast to four. The last estimate of the raion population was

References

Former raions of Poltava Oblast
1925 establishments in Ukraine
Ukrainian raions abolished during the 2020 administrative reform